Uroš Seljak (born 13 May 1966 in Nova Gorica) is a Slovenian cosmologist and a professor of astronomy and physics at University of California, Berkeley. He is particularly well-known for his research in cosmology and approximate Bayesian statistical methods.

Biography 

Seljak completed his secondary education at the Nova Gorica Grammar School and carried out his undergraduate studies at the University of Ljubljana, Slovenia. He graduated in 1989 and later received a Master's degree from the same institution in 1991. Seljak conducted his doctoral research at Massachusetts Institute of Technology and received his PhD in 1995.

After postdoctoral studies at the Center for Astrophysics  Harvard & Smithsonian, he held faculty positions at Princeton University, the International Centre for Theoretical Physics in Trieste, Italy, and the University of Zurich, before joining the UC Berkeley physics and astronomy departments in 2008. He holds a joint appointment with the  Lawrence Berkeley National Laboratory.

Career 
Seljak is a cosmologist who is particularly well-known for his research on cosmic microwave background radiation, galaxy clustering and weak gravitational lensing, and the implications of these observations for the large scale structure of the universe.

In 1997, Seljak predicted the existence of B-modes in CMB polarization that are a tracer of primordial gravitational waves from inflation. Together with Matias Zaldarriaga, he developed the CMBFAST code for CMB Temperature, E and B-mode polarization, and for gravitational lensing effects on CMB.

In 2000, he developed the halo model for dark matter and galaxy clustering statistics.

Much of Seljak's recent work has been focused on how to extract fundamental properties of our universe from cosmological observations using analytical methods and numerical simulations. He has developed cosmological generative models of dark matter, stars and cosmic gas distributions, including differentiable FastPM code and its extensions.

Seljak is actively developing methods for accelerated approximate Bayesian methodologies, and applying them to cosmology, astronomy, and other sciences. Examples of this work are the expectation optimization of L2 f-divergence for stochastic variational Bayes inference, Gaussianized bridge sampling for Bayesian evidence, and BayesFast, a surrogate model-based Hamiltonian Monte Carlo sampler.

Seljak is developing machine learning methods with applications to cosmology, astronomy, and other sciences. Notable examples include Fourier-based Gaussian processes for analysis of time and/or spatially ordered data, generative models with explicit physics symmetries (translation, rotation), and sliced iterative transport methods for density estimation and sampling.

Honours and awards
Seljak was awarded the 2021 Gruber Prize in Cosmology jointly with Marc Kamionkowski and Matias Zaldarriaga, who together "introduced numerous techniques for the study of the large-scale structure of the universe as well as the properties of its first instant of existence."

 David and Lucille Packard Research Fellow (2000)
 Sloan Research Fellow (2001)
 Helen B. Warner Prize for Astronomy (2001)
 Fellow of the American Physical Society (2013)
 Member of the US National Academy of Sciences (2019)
 Highest cited Slovenian scientist (2019)
 International Science Photography competition winner (2019)
 Gruber Prize in Cosmology (2021)

Notable students 
 Chris Hirata

References 

1966 births
Living people
Slovenian physicists
Cosmologists
University of Ljubljana alumni
Massachusetts Institute of Technology alumni
Princeton University faculty
University of California, Berkeley faculty
Academic staff of the University of Zurich
People from Nova Gorica
Members of the United States National Academy of Sciences
Sloan Research Fellows